Gulzar may refer to:

People
Gulzar, pen name of Indian lyricist and filmmaker Sampooran Singh Kalra (born 1934)
Gulzar Alam (born 1959), Pashto singer from Pakistan
Gulzar Singh Cheema (born 1954), Indian-born Canadian politician
Rakhee Gulzar (born 1947), Indian actress

Places

Afghanistan
 Golzar, Kabul, a village also spelled Gulzar
 Golzar, Kandahar, a village also spelled Gulzar

Pakistan
 Gulzar, Kharan, a town
 Gulzar, Mardan, a village
 Gulzar, Quetta, a town
 Gulzar, Pakistan, a town
 Gulzar, Punjab, a town
 Gulzar Colony, a neighbourhood of Korangi Town in Karachi

Turkey
 Akdurmuş, Bingöl, a village also known as Gulzar

See also
 Places in Pakistan:
 Gulzar Kalle, a village in Bannu District 
 Gulzar Khanwala, a village in  Dera Ghazi Khan District
 Gulzar malik, a village in Gatti District Faisalabad, Punjab, Pakistan
 Gulzar-e-Hijri, in Gulshan Town, Karachi
 Gulzar Bhulkani, a town in Jacobabad District
 Golzar (disambiguation)

Arabic masculine given names